Zopyrion is a genus of butterflies in the Hesperiidae (skipper) family and the Pyrgini tribe. The type species, Zopyrion sandace, was described in 1896 by Frederick DuCane Godman and Osbert Salvin in their Biologia Centrali-Americana.

Species
Zopyrion evenor Godman, [1901]
Zopyrion reticulata Hayward, 1942
Zopyrion sandace Godman & Salvin, [1896]
Zopyrion satyrina (C. & R. Felder, 1867)
Zopyrion subvariegata Hayward, 1942

References

Hesperiidae
Hesperiidae genera
Taxa named by Frederick DuCane Godman
Taxa named by Osbert Salvin